Percha Dam State Park is a state park of New Mexico, United States, located  south of Truth or Consequences, New Mexico on the Rio Grande. The dam's purpose is to raise the elevation of the Rio Grande slightly to allow irrigation of the chile pepper crop downstream.

The park is popular for fishing, rafting, kayaking, and bird watching, and it is especially popular during the spring and autumn migration seasons.

References

External links
 Percha Dam State Park

State parks of New Mexico
Parks in Sierra County, New Mexico
Protected areas established in 1970
Rio Grande
1970 establishments in New Mexico